"Schickeria" is a song recorded in 1981 by Austrian singer Rainhard Fendrich, included on his album Und alles is ganz anders word'n. The song reached #1 in his home country on January 1, 1982 for one week. It also charted in Germany, reaching No. 47.

Schickeria is an electro pop song with light reggae influences.

References

1982 singles
Rainhard Fendrich songs
1981 songs